Kayelle Rhealin Clarke (born 28 February 1996) is a sprinter from Trinidad and Tobago. She represented her country at the 2017 World Championships without advancing from the first round.

International competitions

Personal bests

Outdoor
100 metres – 11.31 (+0.9 m/s, Port-of-Spain 2017)
200 metres – 22.97 (0.0 m/s, Port-of-Spain 2017)
400 metres – 56.47 (Canyon 2015)

Indoor
60 metres – 7.67 (Fayetteville 2017)
200 metres – 23.86 (Albuquerque 2015)
400 metres – 57.36 (Albuquerque 2016)

References

1996 births
Living people
Trinidad and Tobago female sprinters
World Athletics Championships athletes for Trinidad and Tobago
People from Siparia region
Competitors at the 2018 Central American and Caribbean Games